In English poetic metre and modern linguistics, a trochee is a metrical foot consisting of a stressed syllable followed by an unstressed one. But in Latin and Ancient Greek poetic metre, a trochee is a heavy syllable followed by a light one (also described as a long syllable followed by a short one). In this respect, a trochee is the reverse of an iamb. Thus the Latin word  "there", because of its short-long rhythm, in Latin metrical studies is considered to be an iamb, but since it is stressed on the first syllable, in modern linguistics it is considered to be a trochee.

The adjective form is trochaic. The English word trochee is itself trochaic since it is composed of the stressed syllable  followed by the unstressed syllable .

Another name formerly used for a trochee was a choree, or choreus.

Etymology
Trochee comes from French , adapted from Latin , originally from the Greek , 'wheel', from the phrase , literally 'running foot'; it is connected with the word  , 'I run'. The phrase was adapted into English in the late 16th century.

There was a well-established ancient tradition that trochaic rhythm is faster than iambic. When used in drama it is often associated with lively situations. One ancient commentator notes that it was named from the metaphor of people running and the Roman metrician Marius Victorinus notes that it was named from its running and speed.

Examples 

Trochaic meter is sometimes seen among the works of William Shakespeare:

Double, double, toil and trouble;
Fire burn and cauldron bubble.

Perhaps owing to its simplicity, though, trochaic meter is fairly common in nursery rhymes:

Peter, Peter pumpkin-eater
Had a wife and couldn't keep her.

Trochaic verse is also well known in Latin poetry, especially of the medieval period. Since the stress never falls on the final syllable in Medieval Latin, the language is ideal for trochaic verse. The dies irae of the Requiem mass is an example:

Dies irae, dies illa
Solvet saeclum in favilla
Teste David cum Sibylla.

The Finnish national epic Kalevala, like much old Finnish poetry, is written in a variation of trochaic tetrameter.

Trochaic metre is popular in Polish and Czech literatures. Vitězslav Nezval's poem Edison is written in trochaic hexameter.

The Taylor Swift song "Blank Space" contains examples of trochaic metre in its chorus, which is responsible for many listeners mishearing part of the lyric because the line "Got a long list of ex-lovers" is forced into an unnatural shape to fit the stress pattern:

Got a long list of ex-lovers

Where the stress would, in spoken English, naturally fall on the 'ex' of 'ex-lovers', it instead falls on 'of' and the first syllable of 'lovers', which can confuse on first hearing and cause the mind to try to fit an alternative two-syllable word (like "Starbucks") into the 'of ex-' foot: supposedly, the line is misheard as "All the lonely Starbucks lovers".

Latin
In Greek and Latin, the syllabic structure deals with long and short syllables, rather than accented and unaccented. Trochaic meter was rarely used by the Latin poets, except in certain passages of the tragedies and the comedies.

See also 
 Monometer
 Prosody (Latin)
 Substitution (poetry), Trochaic substitution
 Prosody (Greek)
 Trochaic septenarius

References 

 

Metrical feet